Lee Jeong-eun (born 20 October 1988) is a South Korean professional golfer. For scoring purposes, she is called Jeongeun Lee5 to differentiate herself from other Korean LPGA golfers with that name, including the younger Jeongeun Lee6.

Lee played on the LPGA of Korea Tour where she won five times between 2009 and 2015. Since 2017, she has played primarily on the LPGA Tour. Her best finish on the LPGA Tour is T-3 at the 2017 ShopRite LPGA Classic.

LPGA of Korea Tour wins
2009 (2) Asia Today-KYJ Golf Ladies Open, Shinsegae KLPGA Championship
2010 (1) Hyundai E&C Seokyung Ladies Open
2011 (1) Nefs Masterpiece
2015 (1) Jeju Samdasoo Masters

Events in bold are KLPGA majors.

References

External links
Lee Jeong-eun at the KLPGA Tour official site 

South Korean female golfers
LPGA of Korea Tour golfers
LPGA Tour golfers
1988 births
Living people
20th-century South Korean women
21st-century South Korean women